Protein CDV3 homolog also known as carnitine deficiency-associated gene expressed in ventricle 3 is a protein that in humans is encoded by the CDV3 gene.

CDV3 is a biomarker for hepatocellular carcinoma. CDV3 has been considered as a potential target for gene therapy. Related gene families include plasma proteins and predicted intracellular proteins.

Gene

Aliases 
The CDV3 protein is also commonly known as tyrosine-phosphorylated protein 36 (TPP36). TPP36 isoforms have been found to be substrates of Abl tyrosine kinase.

Locus 
The CDV3 gene is on chromosome 3 (3q22.1).

Exons 
There were variations in the listed number of exons in CDV3 between genetic databases. The number of exons vary based on the isoform in question, with most transcript isoforms having 5 exons.

Span 
The exons of human CDV3 gene's longest transcript isoform span 16,711 bp.

Transcripts

Isoforms 
CDV3 has seven isoforms, and more are continuously added to databases as they are discovered. Currently there are isoforms a-f.

Protein 

Molecular weight: 27.3 kD

Protein length: 258 aa

Isoelectric point: 5.89

Motifs 
A SAPS analysis on the human CDV3 protein sequence found one uncharged cluster segment from 28-75 aa. There were no signs of high scoring hydrophobic segments. One high scoring transmembrane segment was found from 28-55 aa. CDV3 was found to have significant maximal spacing from 27-76 aa.

Repeats 
The following repetitive structures were found for the protein.

Aligned matching blocks:

[45-52]  AGAAGGGA

[66-73]  AGAAGPGA

with superset:

  [32-36]   AGAAG

  [45-49]   AGAAG

  [  66- 70]   AGAAG

__

[134-137]   MEKS

[213-216]   MEKS

__

Simple tandem repeat: 

[31-43]   AAGAA_GSAGGSSG

[44-54]   AAGAAGGGAGA

Predicted Motifs 
PROSITE found several potential motifs in CDV3.

Predicted Secondary Structure 

The following programs were used to develop this figure: JPred, CFSSP, and GOR4. The majority of the CDV3 structure is hypothesized to be alpha helices and random coil.

Predicted 3D Structure 
The 3D structure of CDV3 was predicted through amino acid submission to the Zhang Lab and their I-TASSER program.

Gene regulation

Promoter 
There are currently six different predicted promoters based on supporting transcripts. The following promoters were found using Genomatix. Promoter GXP_141972 was chosen for further analysis because of the large number of supporting transcripts, and it was found to be conserved in 14 of 14 orth. loci.    

*No transcript assigned.

Expression patterns 
CDV3 is ubiquitously expressed, and at relatively high levels, in all tissues examined in the humans. Higher expression existed in certain diseases.

Gene profile 
Various experiments showing expression of CDV3 demonstrated different patterns of tissue expression; however, it is concluded that the gene is expressed ubiquitously throughout all tissue types with more expression within tissues involved in the immune system and skeletal muscle tissue.

The expression of CDV3 generally decreases throughout fetal development, but expression levels remain high.

Protein Level Regulation 
A conceptual translation was made from NCBI reference sequence NM_017548.4. Amino acids conserved in at least 70% of vertebrate orthologous proteins are bolded (seen in the section below).

Evolution

Orthologs 
The following orthologs were found through the NCBI database. The date of divergence between species and Homo sapies was determined using TimeTree. The sequence identity and similarity were found using BLAST.

Paralogs 
No human paralogs were found for CDV3 GeneCards and GenesLikeMe databases through the Weizmann Institute of Science. There were not any other relevant sources when the Google Search was conducted.

Phylogenetic tree 
A phylogenetic tree was developed from the species listed in the table above using "One Click Mode" on Phylogeny.fr.

Interacting proteins

Clinical significance 
As earlier in the article, CDV3 has been found to be expressed in patients with various cancers and HIV. CDV3 has also been found to interact with Pr55 in the HIV retrovirus. Without further testing in expression, it is hard to determine how levels alter depending on disease state or the role this gene plays in these illnesses.

References 

Proteins
Biomarkers